Harry Anderson (1952–2018) was an American actor, comedian, and magician.

Harry Anderson may also refer to:
Harry Anderson (coach) (1872–1957), American football coach
Harry Anderson (Scottish footballer) (1888–1939), Scottish footballer (Raith Rovers, Hibernian, St Mirren, national team)
Harry Anderson (artist) (1906–1996), American artist
Harry Anderson (Canadian football) (c. 1926–1996), Canadian football player
Harry Anderson (baseball) (1931–1998), American baseball player
Harry Anderson (chemist) (born 1964), British chemist
Harry Anderson (English footballer) (born 1997), English footballer
Harry Anderson (American football) (1927–1997), American football player and coach
Harry A. Anderson, US Army Major in the Monuments, Fine Arts, and Archives program
Harry B. Anderson (1879–1935), U.S. federal judge
Harry Reuben Anderson (1844–1918), American general
Harry W. Anderson (1922–2018), American businessman, art collector, and philanthropist

See also
Harold Anderson (disambiguation)
Harry Andersson (1913–1996), Swedish footballer
Harry Andersson (Djurgårdens IF Fotboll footballer), Swedish footballer
Henry Anderson (disambiguation)